is an airfield on the island of Chichi-jima in Japan. It has a landing slope facility for flying boats (e.g. Shin Meiwa US-1A/US-2) and a heliport for the Japan Maritime Self-Defense Force (JMSDF) Chichijima Naval Base.

Both bases were under the control of the United States Navy from shortly after Japan's surrender in 1945 up to 1968. During that time the naval base was known as Chichi Jima Naval Base.

Plans to build a full airport have been created and withdrawn several times, because of environmental concerns.

References

Airports in Tokyo
Japan Maritime Self-Defense Force bases